Siddhant Karnick (born 15 March 1983) is an Indian actor. He made his television debut playing Arjun Khanna in romantic teen drama show Remix (2004-2006) but gained popularity and became a household name with his portrayal of Rana Indravadhan Singh Deo in the award-winning television show Ek Tha Raja Ek Thi Rani (2015-2016).

Karnick's other notable television shows include Mahi Way (2010), Rishta.com (2010), Pyaar Kii Ye Ek Kahaani (2010-2011), Kismat (2011), Aasman Se Aage (2012) and Mere Sai (2018). He also appeared in episodic roles in various shows such as Yeh Hai Aashiqui (2013), Savdhaan India (2013), MTV Big F (2017), Kaal Bhairav Rahasya (2018). Apart from television shows he has appeared in few films such as Fast Forward (2009), Yeh Mera India (2009), Blue Oranges (2009), Lafangey Parindey (2010) and Listen Amaya (2013). In 2020, he appeared in the film Thappad, in the role of Viraj Sabharwal, which was co-produced and directed by Anubhav Sinha.

Life
Karnick was born on March 15, 1983, in Mumbai to Kiran Karnick. In August 2016, he married fellow actress Megha Gupta. However, the reports of trouble in their marriage first surfaced in 2019. Later, the couple decided to live separately and soon declared their separation. And then the divorce was finalised in March 2020.

Youtube as a hobby
Karnick is a Motorcycle Monk, who parts and shares experiences through his vlogs. He loves to share his riding journeys with people and to maintain the same he even started his YouTube channel - Siddhant Karnick. He believes in exploring and learning while travelling. He is also a passionate photographer and loves to edit and conceptualize most of his content by himself.

Career
He made his screen debut with the show Remix (2004-2006) in the role of Arjun Khanna, which was produced by Goldie Behl and Shrishti Behl Arya. Then he went onto star in many television shows like Jhoome Jiiya Re (2008), Mahi Way (2010), Rishta.com (2010). In 2011, he appeared in teen drama show Pyaar Kii Ye Ek Kahaani (2010-2011) as Siddharth Raichand, his performance was praised in the show. After wrapping up Pyaar Kii Ye Ek Kahaani, he was mostly seen in recurring or in episodic roles like Kismat (2011), Aasman Se Aage (2012), Yeh Hai Aashiqui (2013), Savdhaan India (2013), Gustakh Dil (2014). Then in 2015, Karnick returned as lead in period drama show Ek Tha Raja Ek Thi Rani, along with Drashti Dhami and Surekha Sikri. The Show was produced by Sujoy Wadhwa. He received praises from the audience and became as a household name. And after Karnick's exit from the show in 2016, he was seen again in episodic roles in MTV Big F (2017), Mere Sai (2018) and in Kaal Bhairav Rahasya Season 2 (2018).

Despite active in the Indian television industry, he was appearing in some short films and in small roles in bollywood films. He has done short films like The Mole (2008), The Au Revoir (2011) and Project 11 (2011). The Au Revoir was a French short film based in Mumbai, directed by Jean Louis Carrasco. He made his film debut with Fast Forward in 2009. Then he appeared in Yeh Mera India (2009), Blue Oranges (2009), Lafangey Parindey (2009) and Listen Amaya (2013).

Then in 2020, Karnick appeared in critically and commercially acclaimed film Thappad, starring Taapsee Pannu in lead. It was directed by Anubhav Sinha.

Filmography

Television

Films

References

Notes

References

External links

Siddhant Karnick on YouTube

1984 births
Living people
Male actors from Mumbai
Indian male television actors
Male actors in Hindi television
21st-century Indian male actors
Indian male soap opera actors
Indian male film actors
Indian YouTubers
Artists from Mumbai
YouTube vloggers
Actors from Mumbai